The Voice for Animals Humane Society (V4A) in Edmonton, Alberta, is a non-profit organization dedicated to protecting animals, through advocacy and education, from neglect, abuse and exploitation. This volunteer organization helps animals of all kinds through animal rescue, education, lobbying politicians, protests, letter writing and petitions. The president, Tove Reece, has been involved in animal rights' work for over twenty years.

Campaigns

Lucy and Samantha
Lucy, an Asian elephant, and Samantha, an African elephant, live at the Edmonton Valley Zoo. Lucy suffers from arthritis and chronic foot infections. Samantha severed her trunk on a gate latch and lost  of it. The Elephant Sanctuary in Hohenwald, Tennessee, has agreed to take them both. A letter writing campaign and petition are ongoing.

Additionally, Zoocheck Canada launched a Kids Save Lucy campaign in June 2009 to help Lucy.

References

External links
 The Voice for Animals Humane Society
 The Elephant Sanctuary

Edmonton
Non-profit organizations based in Alberta